Route 11 is a , two-lane, uncontrolled-access, secondary highway in western Prince Edward Island, Canada. Its southern terminus is at Route 1A (Read Drive) in Summerside and its northern terminus is at Route 2 in Lady Slipper.

Route description 

The route begins at its southern terminus and heads west through the downtown of Summerside. It continues west through Miscouche and Mont-Carmel before turning northward near Cape Egmont. It crosses the Haldimand River and turns left in Abrams Village to continue north. A left turn in Higgins Road, a right turn just north of that, and another left turn in Victoria West makes it continue north. In Enmore, the route turns right once again and ends at its northern terminus.

References 

011
011